Oronoco may refer to:

Places in the United States
Oronoco, Minnesota
Oronoco Township, Minnesota
Oronoco, Virginia

Other uses
Oronoco Rum, produced in Brazil

See also
 Orinoco (disambiguation)